Trafikselskabet Movia is the public transport agency that is responsible for buses and certain local railways in Copenhagen and the part of Denmark east of the Great Belt, covering the regions Sjælland and Hovedstaden, except for Bornholm, which is a 100% owner of BAT, formerly, before 1 January 2003, transit agency Bornholms Amts Trafikselskab. It does not own any buses and trains itself, but pays subcontractors to run them. It is a part owner of train company Lokaltog. It has an integrated fare system in collaboration with the Copenhagen metro and DSB, which means that the same tickets are valid on all buses and trains.

Movia was created on January 1, 2007 as part of the 2007 municipal reform. Its predecessors were the county transit agencies of the old Vestsjællands Amt and Storstrøms Amt, and HUR Trafik which covered the old "capital region" consisting of Roskilde Amt, Frederiksborg Amt, and Københavns Amt (plus the independent municipalities of Copenhagen and Frederiksberg). Each of the three agencies had its own integrated fare system, which have been continued by Movia as three distinct "fare areas", with small changes to the existing inter-agency fare rules.

The company is owned by the two regions and by the 45 municipalities it services (not Bornholm).

A new seamless fare system which replaces most paper tickets by contactless smartcards (see Rejsekort) is currently being introduced. It is currently (when?) fully implemented in the western Zealand (Vestsjælland) and southern Zealand (Sydsjælland) fare areas, with partial implementation in the capital area (Hovedstadsområdet).

Movia has seven night bus lines: 90N, 91N, 93N, 94N, 97N, 98N and 99N which mostly operate on Friday and Saturday nights between the hours of 01:00 and 05:00. Buses generally depart on the hour or every second hour. Bus stop signs of night bus routes are recognisable by their grey colour. Various A-bus, S-bus and R-bus lines also have departures at night or have departures at night after Friday and Saturday.

See also
CityCirkel
Copenhagen Harbour Buses
Transport in Copenhagen

References

External links 
  

Public transport in Denmark
Transport in Copenhagen
2007 establishments in Denmark